2016 Empress's Cup Final was the 38th final of the Empress's Cup competition. The final was played at Chiba Soga Football Stadium in Chiba on December 25, 2016. INAC Kobe Leonessa won the championship.

Overview
INAC Kobe Leonessa won their 6th title, by defeating Albirex Niigata on a penalty shoot-out. INAC Kobe Leonessa won the title for 2 years in a row.

Match details

See also
2016 Empress's Cup

References

Empress's Cup
2016 in Japanese women's football
Japanese Women's Cup Final 2016